Joyce Chao or Chao Hung-chiao (born 15 November 1979) is a Taiwanese actress, singer and television host. She was a member of Taiwanese female group 7 Flowers. During years in school, her friends introduced her to a model company. After graduation, she entered Jungiery. She was cast in the film Shanghai Ghetto, a love story between a Jewish Refugee and a Chinese woman during World War Two. She played the role of Alice Chen, a friend of the protagonist.

Filmography 
 Westside Story (2003)
 100% Senorita (2004)
 The Champion (2004)
 The Prince Who Turns into a Frog (2005)
 Smiling Pasta (2006)
 Full Count (2007)
 Your Home is My Home (2008)
 Local Hero (2011)
 Women Flower (2012)
 Untold Stories of 1949 (2013)
 Shanghai Ghetto (上海隔都) (2012)
 Forget You Remember Love (2020)

References 
 

1979 births
Living people
Actresses from Taipei
21st-century Taiwanese actresses
21st-century Taiwanese singers
Taiwanese television actresses
Taiwanese television presenters
21st-century Taiwanese women singers
Taiwanese women television presenters